Kaleidoscope World is a compilation album by New Zealand group The Chills, released in 1986 on Flying Nun Records in New Zealand and on Creation Records in UK.
The album was a compilation of early singles, plus all the Chills' tracks which featured on the Dunedin Double EP and The Lost EP. It was reissued in 1987 by Flying Nun with a bonus 7-inch single, "I'll Only See You Alone Again"/"Green Eyed Owl". It was rereleased again in 2016 by Flying Nun and Captured Tracks with a further 7 bonus tracks.

Track listing
Original 12" vinyl release on Flying Nun Records.

Side A
"Rolling Moon" - 3:50
"Pink Frost" - 3:57
"Hidden Bay" - 1:30
"Satin Doll" - 4:23
Side B
"Doledrums" - 3:06
"Kaleidoscope World" - 3:40
"Purple Girl" - 3:23
"Flame-Thrower" - 3:15

Re-release CD on Flying Nun Records – FNE 13CD in 1989.

"Kaleidoscope World" - 03:40
"Satin Doll" - 04:23
"Frantic Drift" - 04:12
"Rolling Moon" - 03:51
"Bite" - 02:32
"Flame Thrower" - 03:16
"Pink Frost" - 03:57
"Purple Girl" - 03:23
"This Is The Way" - 02:31
"Never Never Go" - 02:06
"Don't Even Know Her Name" - 01:51
"Bee Bah Bee Bah Bee Boe" - 02:44
"Whole Weird World" - 03:25
"Dream By Dream" - 05:20
"Doledrums" - 03:10
"Hidden Bay" - 01:44
"I Love My Leather Jacket" - 02:54
"The Great Escape" - 02:29

Re-release CD/2XLP/Digital on Flying Nun Records - FN567 in 2016

"Kaleidoscope World"
"Satin Doll"
"Frantic Drift"
"Rolling Moon"
"Bite"
"Flame Thrower"
"Pink Frost"
"Purple Girl"
"This Is The Way"
"Never Never Go"
"Don't Even Know Her Name"
"Bee Bah Bee Bah Bee Boe"
"Whole Weird World"
"Dream By Dream"
"Doledrums"
"Hidden Bay"
"I Love My Leather Jacket"
"The Great Escape"
"Oncoming Day" (Early Version)
"Dan Destiny and The Silver Dawn" (Unplugged)
"Martyns Doctor Told Me"
"I'll Only See You Alone Again"
"Green Eyed Owl" (Live)
"Smile From A Dead Dead Face" (Live)

References

1986 compilation albums
The Chills albums
Creation Records albums
Creation Records compilation albums
Flying Nun Records compilation albums